Arcade Classics is a video game compilation for the Philips CD-i containing ports of three Namco arcade games. The compilation was released in Europe but not in North America.

It contains the games Galaxian (1979), Ms. Pac-Man (1981), and Galaga (1981). Galaxian resembles the Famicom port instead of it representing the original arcade game. Galaga is cropped into a "window" while the status (lives, score, etc.) is moved into the outer frame. Ms. Pac-Man resembles Tengen's ports of the game and even includes the extras from their ports (multiple sets of mazes, simultaneous multiplayer, etc.).

See also
List of Namco retro video game compilations

CD-i games
Namco games
1996 video games
Europe-exclusive video games
Bandai Namco video game compilations